is a passenger railway station  located in the city of Tottori, Tottori Prefecture, Japan. It is operated by the West Japan Railway Company (JR West). The name of the station translates to Station in front of Tottori University.

Lines

Station layout
The station consists of one side platform with the platform is located one step below the station building due to topographical reasons. The station is staffed.

Platforms

Adjacent stations
West Japan Railway Company (JR West)

History
Tottoridaigakumae Station opened on 27 July 1995.

Passenger statistics
In fiscal 2020, the station was used by an average of 1534 passengers daily.

See also
List of railway stations in Japan

References

External links 

 Tottoridaigakumae Station from JR-Odekake.net 

Railway stations in Tottori Prefecture
Stations of West Japan Railway Company
Sanin Main Line
Railway stations in Japan opened in 1995
Tottori (city)